Iron Mike is a name used for memorial statues of American servicemen.

Iron Mike may also refer to:

People
Michael D. Healy (1926–2018), U.S. Army general and Special Forces legend 
Michael DiBiase (1923–1969), professional wrestler
Mike Ditka (born 1939), National Football League player and coach
Mike Donahue (1876–1960), college football coach
Mike Gapes (born 1952), former member of the United Kingdom's Labour Party
Mike Keenan (born 1949), National Hockey League head coach and general manager
Michael Malloy (1873–1933), Irish murder victim
Mike Marshall (pitcher) (born 1943), Major League Baseball pitcher
Ernest L. Massad (1908–1993), US Army general
John H. Michaelis (1912–1985), US Army general
Mick Murphy (cyclist) (1934–2015), Irish cyclist
Iron Mike Norton (born 1973), American blues musician
John W. O'Daniel (1894–1975), U.S. Army general
Mike Prendergast (baseball) (1888–1967), American Major League Baseball pitcher
Michael Russell (tennis) (born 1978), American tennis player
Mike Sharpe (1952–2016), professional wrestler
Mike Tenay (born 1954), professional wrestling commentator
Mike Tyson (born 1966), American boxer
Mike Webster (1952–2002), National Football League player
Mike Webster (Canadian football) (born 1944), Canadian Football League player and professional wrestler
Mike Williamson (footballer) (born 1983), Newcastle United footballer
Mike Zambidis (born 1980), Greek kickboxer

Other uses
Iron Mike (fountain), a cast iron fountain in Oregon, Illinois
Iron Mike Productions, a boxing promotion company based in Deerfield Beach, Florida
Nautical slang for an autopilot system
Baseball slang for a pitching machine
"Iron Mike", a poem by Charles Bukowski from the book Love is a Dog From Hell

Lists of people by nickname